The National Negro Bar Association (NNBA) was the first national bar association for African-American lawyers in the United States.

The NNBA was founded in Little Rock, Arkansas in 1912.  At the time, and for some thereafter, the American Bar Association refused to accept black members, making the NNBA the only national bar association that black lawyers could join. The NNBA's first president was Josiah T. Settle of Memphis, Tennessee, who served as president until 1913. Others active in organizing the NNBA included Scipio Africanus Jones.

The NNBA was an adjunct to the National Negro Business League (NNBL), which had been organized by Booker T. Washington. The NNBA was one of several specialized African-American professional organizations that grew out of the NNBL.  The NNBA ultimately foundered due to its members' dissatisfaction with the NNBL's tolerance of racism and unwillingness to advocate aggressively for social change.

The NNBA met annually from 1909 to 1919. The annual meetings attracted around 50 lawyers each year. The membership was dominated by lawyers from the American South.

The attendance of attorney Lutie Lytle at the NNBA's 1913 meeting made history, as she became the first African-American woman to participate in a national bar association.

The NNBA's operations ceased in 1922. The last president of the NNBA was Perry W. Howard, who had also served as the NNBA's first secretary.

In 1925, the National Bar Association (NBA) was formed, taking over the NNBA's previous role as the country's nationwide black bar association.  In 1926, NBA president Charles H. Calloway publicly denied any relationship to the old NNBA.

References

Works cited

1912 establishments in Arkansas
1922 disestablishments in the United States
Organizations established in 1912
Organizations disestablished in 1922
American bar associations
African-American professional organizations